The St. Aloysius Church is a Catholic parish church in Spokane, Washington, United States located on the grounds of Gonzaga University.

History 
Jesuit missionaries arrived in the Pacific Northwest between 1842 and 1866. Among them was Father Joseph Cataldo, S.J. who eventually founded Gonzaga University in 1887. The first church for the Jesuits was St. Joseph church, a rudimentary wooden structure. Under the direction of Father Mackin, a project to construct a new church for the university was proposed in 1904. Due to controversy and rumors that the church would be erected without the support of resident worshipers, the project was delayed. In 1909 the project resumed under the supervision of Father Goller. The St. Joseph church was relocated and space for the new church was ready for construction. Estimated cost for the building was $100,000, half of which had been promised by donors and $30,000 already collected. The first published sketch of the building appeared in the Spokesman-Review on October 10, 1909. St. Aloysius Church was named for Saint Aloysius Gonzaga, the “Patron of Youth”, as was Gonzaga University. The cornerstone was laid on October 24. Accompanied by a ceremony with large attendance numbers, a parchment was laid inside the stone that read:

"The First Cornerstone of this Holy Temple, Dedicated to St. Aloysius Gonzaga, was laid and blessed, in the presence of a great concourse of clergy and people, and with due solemnity, by the Rt. Rev. Edward John O'Dea, Bishop of the Diocese of Seattle. To the Greater Glory of God."

The final mass at St. Joseph's was held on October 11, 1911. St. Aloysius was opened on October 12, almost two years after the construction began. Of the thousands of people that showed for the opening mass at St. Aloysius, only 200 were admitted. Celebration and a large banquet ensued for all attendees with speeches from many influential religious leaders of the time.

The parish was formed in 1890. Singer Bing Crosby, who grew up in the neighborhood, was an altar boy at St. Aloysius, and sang in the choir. In October 2013, a memorial service for Gonzaga graduate and House Speaker Tom Foley was held at St. Aloysius. 

In August 2021, Father Tom Lamanna of St. Aloysius  and Father JK Adams of Gonzaga Prep appeared in the PSA, which was done in partnership with the Washington Department of Health in support of the safety and efficacy of COVID-19 vaccines. In many cases people were claiming religious exemptions. The priests encouraged the public to “take seriously all the data and all of the science” in regards to vaccinations, noting that it was inaccurate to think of science and religion in opposition to each other.

Architecture 

St. Aloysius Church was designed in Romanesque style by the Spokane firm of Preusse & Zittel with rounded arches. The church seems as if it has vast amounts of space and allows natural light to illuminate the space.

St. Aloysius Church is famous for its twin steeples that can be seen from many locations across the Gonzaga University campus and Spokane. Illuminated by 40 lights, the crosses atop the steeples are meant to be seen at every hour. It has the largest seating capacity among Catholic churches in Spokane. The great bell Catherina is housed in one of them.

Inside, the church features oak woodwork, altars and ambo of matching Italian marble, and a 1928 pipe organ by George Kilgen and Son in a side gallery of the sanctuary. The firm responsible for designing the church’s Stations of the Cross was Franz Mayer of Munich. Mayers’ was also tasked with designing the stained-glass windows surrounding the church that depict Jesuit saints and the life of St. Aloysius himself. In recent years, four new windows have been added.

A ramp makes the basement accessible for a senior lunch on Thursdays.

A bronze statue of St. Aloysius outside the church, created by Anita Pauwels, depicts him carrying a victim of the plague.

Present day
St. Aloysius Parish is part of the Roman Catholic Diocese of Spokane. The parish is staffed by Jesuit priests of the USA West Province of the Society of Jesus. Although they are separate entities, parish and university communities interact. Many of the Jesuits who teach at Gonzaga assist at the parish.

The parish includes the faculty, staff and students of the university, as well as people in the neighborhood of the university. It offers a Sunday evening liturgy, for the convenience of students. There are about fifty-five funerals a year. Of the three locations for weddings at Gonzaga, (including the University Chapel and St. Michael's Chapel), St Aloysius is the most popular among students and alumni. 

An annual novena is held each March in honor of St. Francis Xavier. Parishioners, Gonzaga Prep students, and members of the community volunteer to help feed about 500 people at the free St. Al's Thanksgiving Dinner. The church is also the site of symphony and choral concerts, such as Gonzaga University Chorale’s annual Christmas Candlelight Concert.

The parish is a supporter of the "Family Promise" program of Spokane, which assists the homeless,  and participates in the Eastern Washington Legislative Conference, an annual interfaith Legislative Conference that focuses on environmental matters. The parish has a sister parish in El Salvador. 

St Aloysius parish has a elementary school and a preschool, serving about 500 children.

Namesake 
 
Both Gonzaga University and St. Aloysius Church are namesakes of Saint Aloysius Gonzaga, the “Patron of Youth”. Saint Aloysius Gonzaga lived a rather brief but impactful life, one admired by followers of Catholicism to this day. Aloysius, known at the time as Luigi de Gonzaga, was born on March 9, 1568, to a family of Italian aristocracy. Many events throughout his upbringing led him to develop a distaste for the opulent lifestyle his family led. Upon discovering a book about Jesuits, scholars and agents of the Roman Catholic religion, who were working in India, he was inspired to join their ranks as a member of the Society of Jesus. For years he struggled with his family as they tried to dissuade him of his decision, but he eventually gave up rights to his inheritance in order to pursue a life of religious devotion.

Aloysius Gonzaga, the Latin form of St. Aloysius’s Italian birthname, is known to have lived an incredibly pious life. His dedication led him to Rome, where he committed his time to caring for those afflicted by the plague of 1591. Despite his superiors’ wishes, he continued to tend to the sick and eventually contracted the plague, which led to his death at the age of 23 on June 21, 1591.

References

External links
 St. Aloysius website

Spokane, Washington
Roman Catholic churches in Washington (state)
Churches in Spokane County, Washington